Archibald Teasdale Scott (22 July 1905 – 1990) was a Scottish professional footballer who played in the Football League for Derby County and Brentford as a centre half.

Career statistics

References

Date of birth unknown
Scottish footballers
English Football League players
Brentford F.C. players
Date of death unknown
Footballers from Airdrie, North Lanarkshire
Association football central defenders
Bellshill Athletic F.C. players
Airdrieonians F.C. (1878) players
Scottish Football League players
Derby County F.C. players
1905 births
1990 deaths
Brentford F.C. wartime guest players